Water polo events were contested at the 1965 Summer Universiade in Budapest, Hungary.

References
 Universiade water polo medalists on HickokSports

1965 Summer Universiade
Universiade
1965
1965